Hosagavi Shivalingaiah Sharath (born 2 June 1993) is an Indian first-class cricketer who plays for Karnataka in domestic cricket. He is a right-arm medium-fast bowler.

He was a revelation in the 2013-14 Ranji Trophy. His overall figures of 8 for 89 against Mumbai in the league phase helped Karnataka to their first-ever outright victory over the Ranji giants. He claimed 53 wickets from seven matches for his state team in the season and was their second highest wicket-taker in the 2013-14 season.

Early life
Hosagavi Shivalingaiah Sharath commonly known as HS Sharath and H. S. Sharath. He received his education at Jain University, Bangalore.

References

External links
HS Sharath - ESPN Cricinfo
HS Sharath - Dream
HS Sharath - NDTV Sports
HS Sharath Profile - cricbuzz

Living people
1993 births
Indian cricketers
Karnataka cricketers
People from Mandya district
Cricketers from Karnataka